Bishop Alemany High School is a Roman Catholic secondary school located in the San Fernando Valley community of Mission Hills in Los Angeles, California. It is within the San Fernando Pastoral Region of the Archdiocese of Los Angeles. The school is accredited by the Western Association of Schools and Colleges. Originally known as the Indians, the school later changed their mascot to the Warriors.

History
Founded in 1947 as a school for girls, the school was originally named St. Ferdinand High School. In 1956, boys were admitted for the first time and the school was renamed to Bishop Alemany High School after Joseph Sadoc Alemany, the first archbishop of San Francisco. It was co-instructional, with separate divisions for girls and boys, until 1970 when it became coeducational.

Alemany High School was first located on the north side of Rinaldi St, just east of Sepulveda Blvd, but due to the Northridge earthquake in 1994 it sustained damage too great to be considered safe. Insomuch, it was decided to move the school across the street into the nearby buildings of Our Lady Queen of Angels Seminary at the historic San Fernando Mission. The high school shared the campus with the seminarians for one year.  The seminary closed in 1995. The 1971 Sylmar earthquake did considerable damage to Alemany's campus, as well.

Notable alumni
Vernon Adams (2011) – Eastern Washington/Oregon quarterback (2012–2015), Montreal Alouettes quarterback (2016–present)
Judy Baca (1964) – Chicana artist/muralist
David Berganio Jr. – professional golfer
Casey Clausen – University of Tennessee quarterback (2000–2003)
Alyssa Diaz (2003) – actress
Andy Dominique (1993) – MLB catcher and former NCAA baseball standout at The University of Nevada, Reno
Kelly Gonez (2006) – President of the LAUSD Board of Education
Gattlin Griffith - actor
Richard "Cheech" Marin (1964) – comedian & actor
Steven Mitchell (2013) – University of Southern California wide receiver (2013-2017), Houston Texans (2019-present)
Jim Pons (1961) – bass guitarist for The Leaves, The Turtles, and The Mothers of Invention
Francia Raisa (2006) – actress
Douglas Tait (1993) – producer, actor, filmmaker
John Tejada (1992) – techno recording artist, producer, remixer, DJ, and label owner
Charli Turner Thorne (1984) – head women's basketball coach at Arizona State University
Robert Torti (1979) – Tony Award-nominated, Broadway actor, film & television performer
Dohnovan West - American football player

Notable faculty 
 Ralph Ahn (19641968), math teacher and football coach
 Casey Clausen football coach
 Rick Clausen football coach
 Stuart Long (19632014), boxer-turned-Catholic priest; inspiration for the 2022 film Father Stu taught at the school from 1998 till 2001.

References

External links

Roman Catholic secondary schools in Los Angeles County, California
High schools in the San Fernando Valley
Educational institutions established in 1956
Mission Hills, Los Angeles
1956 establishments in California
Catholic secondary schools in California